Doushan is a town of Taishan in southwestern Guangdong province, China. , It has 1 residential community and 18 villages under its administration.

References

External links

Towns in Guangdong
Taishan, Guangdong